Melitta is a genus of bees in the family Melittidae. It includes about 40 species restricted to Africa and the northern temperate zone. Most of the species are Palaearctic, though three rare species occur in North America.

They are bees of moderate size, generally 8 to 15 mm long. They are commonly oligolectic, with narrow host plant preferences. They resemble bees of the genus Andrena, though with radically different mouthparts and a scopa limited to the hind tibia and basitarsus.
Melitta have a crucial role as pollinators and they are protected through the Pollinators policy based on EU Biodiversity Strategy 2030.

Species

 Melitta aegyptiaca (Radoszkowski, 1891)
 Melitta albida Cockerell, 1935
 Melitta americana (Smith, 1853)
 Melitta arrogans (Smith, 1879)
 Melitta barbarae Eardley, 2006
 Melitta bicollaris Warncke, 1973
 Melitta budashkini Radchenko & Ivanov, 2012
 Melitta budensis (Mocsáry, 1878)
 Melitta californica Viereck, 1909
 Melitta cameroni (Cockerell, 1910)
 Melitta changmuensis Wu, 1988
 Melitta danae Eardley, 2006
 Melitta dimidiata Morawitz, 1876
 Melitta eickworti Snelling & Stage, 1995
 Melitta engeli Michez, 2012
 Melitta ezoana Yasumatsu & Hirashima, 1956
 Melitta fulvescenta Wu, 2000
 Melitta guichardi Michez, 2007
 Melitta haemorrhoidalis (Fabricius, 1775)
 Melitta harrietae (Bingham, 1897)
 Melitta heilungkiangensis Wu, 1978
 Melitta hispanica Friese 1900
 Melitta iberica Warncke, 1973
 Melitta japonica Yasumatsu & Hirashima, 1956
 Melitta kastiliensis Warncke, 1973
 Melitta katherinae Eardley, 2006
 Melitta latronis Cockerell, 1924
 Melitta leporina (Panzer, 1799)
 Melitta magnifica Michez, 2012
 Melitta maura (Pérez, 1896)
 Melitta melanura (Nylander, 1852)
 Melitta melittoides (Viereck, 1909)
 Melitta mongolica Wu, 1978
 Melitta montana Wu, 1992
 Melitta murciana Warncke, 1973
 Melitta nigrabdominalis Wu, 1988
 Melitta nigricans Alfken, 1905
 Melitta piersbakeri Engel, 2005
 Melitta rasmonti Michez, 2007
 Melitta schmiedeknechti Friese, 1898
 Melitta schultzei Friese, 1909
 Melitta seitzi Alfken 1927
 Melitta sibirica (Morawitz, 1888)
 Melitta singular Michez, 2012
 Melitta tomentosa Friese, 1900
 Melitta tricincta Kirby, 1802
 Melitta udmurtica Sitdikov 1986
 Melitta whiteheadi Eardley, 2006

References

C. D. Michener (2000) The Bees of the World, Johns Hopkins University Press.

External links
 Melitta  Identification Guide
 List of Species
Worldwide Species Map

Bee genera
Melittidae
Taxa named by William Kirby (entomologist)